The canton of Tullins is an administrative division of the Isère department, eastern France. Its borders were modified at the French canton reorganisation which came into effect in March 2015. Its seat is in Tullins.

It consists of the following communes:
 
Beaucroissant
Charnècles
Moirans
Montaud
Poliénas
Réaumont
Renage
Rives
Saint-Blaise-du-Buis
Saint-Jean-de-Moirans
Saint-Quentin-sur-Isère
Tullins
Vourey

References

Cantons of Isère